Cyran is an American singer, songwriter and electronic music producer. 

Other meanings of the name Cyran can refer to:

Sigiramnus or Cyran, 7th century Frankish saint and abbot
Jean Duvergier de Hauranne, known as the abbé de Saint-Cyran, 17th century theologian.
Jacek Cyran, Polish judoka

Places
Saint-Cyran-du-Jambot, French commune